Rudy Pikuzinski (born August 9, 1959 in Buffalo, New York) is a former U.S. soccer forward who spent most of his career playing indoor soccer.  He was a three time American Indoor Soccer Association MVP and served as an assistant coach his last year as a player.

Youth
Pikuzinski, and his brother Randy, grew up in Buffalo, New York where they learned to play from their father.  Pikuzinski attended Bishop Turner High School and The Park School, playing soccer at both.  Pikuzinski set the single season scoring record at The Park School.  He also played with the White Eagles of the Western New York Premier Soccer League, winning four championships.

Professional
Pikuzinski played in the National Soccer League in 1977 with the Buffalo Blazers. In 1983, the Buffalo Stallions of Major Indoor Soccer League (MISL) drafted Pikuzinski.  He played one season with them, but when the Stallions folded at the end of the 1983-1984 season, Pikuzinski moved to the Buffalo Storm of the outdoor United Soccer League.  The Storm folded in 1984 and Pikuzinski signed with the expansion Canton Invaders of the newly established American Indoor Soccer Association (AISA).  Pikuzinski took a back seat to team leading scorer Kia Zolgharnain his first two seasons with the Invaders as the team took two consecutive AISA championships.  In his third season with the Invaders, Pikuzinski became the league’s leading scorer.  He was named a first team All Star and league MVP.  That season, the Invaders lost in the finals, but won the next three championships as Pikuzinski earned his second and third MVP awards. During the 1987 outdoor season he returned to the National Soccer League to play with St. Catharines Wolves. In 1991, Pikuzinski moved to the Cleveland Crunch of MISL.  The Crunch went to the semifinals before falling to the Dallas Sidekicks.  In 1992 after the MISL folded, Pikuzinski returned to Buffalo when he signed with the expansion Buffalo Blizzard of the National Professional Soccer League (NPSL).  Pikuzinski remained with the Blizzard through the 1999-2000 season before he retired from playing professionally.  During his last season of play, he also served as an assistant coach with the Blizzard.

Pikuzinski was inducted into the Greater Buffalo Sports Hall of Fame in 2006.

Honors
MVP: 1987, 1988, 1989
Leading scorer: 1987, 1988

AISA/NPSL All Time Statistical Leaders
6th in Points- 1224
5th in Goals- 511
8th in Assists- 340

Forward for All Time AISA/NPSL Team

First Team All Star
 1987, 1988, 1989, 1990, 1993

References

External links
 MISL stats

1959 births
Living people
American Indoor Soccer Association players
American soccer coaches
American soccer players
American expatriate soccer players
Buffalo Blizzard players
Buffalo Stallions players
Buffalo Storm players
Canton Invaders players
Cleveland Crunch (original MISL) players
St. Catharines Roma Wolves players
Association football forwards
Major Indoor Soccer League (1978–1992) players
National Professional Soccer League (1984–2001) coaches
National Professional Soccer League (1984–2001) players
Sportspeople from Buffalo, New York
Soccer players from New York (state)
United Soccer League (1984–85) players
Canadian National Soccer League players
Expatriate soccer players in Canada
American expatriate sportspeople in Canada